Vectra may refer to the following:
Opel Vectra car (Chevrolet Vectra, Holden Vectra, Vauxhall Vectra)
Opel Vectra GTS V8 DTM car
HP Vectra computer series by Hewlett-Packard
Vectra AI, a private company specializing in artificial intelligence
Vectra (plastic), a brand of polymer products
Global Vectra Helicorp Limited

See also
 Vector (disambiguation)